"I Need a Freak" is an influential rap/electro song, originally released in 1983 by the musical act Sexual Harassment. It has been recorded and sampled many times, most notably by the hip hop group Black Eyed Peas for their 2005 hit song "My Humps". The song itself quotes from Antonín Dvořák's "New World Symphony."

In 2011, the song's composer, Lynn Tolliver, won a $1.2 million lawsuit against former collaborator, James McCants, who licensed use of the song without Tolliver's authorization. Tolliver, a popular, long-time DJ from WZAK in Cleveland, Ohio told the Cleveland Plain Dealer, "I don't get all that money, and I don't have any of it yet, but this couldn't have happened at a better time... I've been unemployed the last few years and was near bankruptcy, so this is a blessing." Tolliver was well-known in Cleveland for his on-air stunts and was once attacked by a gunman at the station in 1985. Tolliver is listed under his pseudonym David Payton on the album credits. The song was also released on the 1996 compilation album, Old School: Volume 6, as well as the 2000 compilation, In Da Beginning...There Was Rap.

A dispute over royalties for the song were heard in an Ohio court in 2014.

Other artists who have covered the song include:
 Egyptian Lover - "I Need a Freak" from Back from the Tomb (1994)
 Esham - "Lowlafalana" from Bruce Wayne: Gothom City 1987 (1997)
 Too $hort - "I Need a Freak" from In tha Beginning...There Was Rap (1997)
 Insane Clown Posse - "Cherry Pie (I Need a Freak)" from Bizzar (2000)
 Electocute - "I Need a Freak" from A Tribute to Your Taste (2003)
 Tyga - "Freak" (2020)

The Sexual Harassment band consisted of Dale Jackson, Lourdes Figueroa, Kelly Albright, Alicia Starr, Charlie Inez and Lynne Poole.

References

External links
 Sexual Harassment page at Discogs
 Lyrics of this song at MusixMatch

1983 songs
Electro songs
Hip hop songs
Sampling controversies
Too Short songs
Music licensing